Jack Brogan (May 12, 1930 – September 14, 2022) was an American art fabricator. He helped produce works by numerous artists including Peter Alexander, Larry Bell, Robert Irwin, and Helen Pashgian.

References 

1930 births
2022 deaths
20th-century American artists
21st-century American artists
Artists from New York City